

Bryophytes

Mollusca

Bivalves

Archosauromorphs

Newly named archosauromorphs

Newly named pseudosuchians

Newly named dinosauriforms

Newly named dinosaurs
Data courtesy of George Olshevsky's dinosaur genera list.

Newly named birds

Synapsids

Newly named therapsids

References

 
Paleontology
Paleontology 2